Giandomenico Salvadori (born 8 October 1992) is an Italian cross-country skier who competes internationally.
 
He represented Italy at the 2018 Winter Olympics.

Cross-country skiing results
All results are sourced from the International Ski Federation (FIS).

Olympic Games

Distance reduced to 30 km due to weather conditions.

World Championships

World Cup

Season standings

References

1992 births
Living people
Italian male cross-country skiers
Olympic cross-country skiers of Italy
Cross-country skiers at the 2018 Winter Olympics
Cross-country skiers at the 2022 Winter Olympics
Tour de Ski skiers
Sportspeople from the Province of Belluno